Parkland Medical Center is an 86-bed hospital in Derry, New Hampshire with an urgent care center in Salem. Parkland was established in 1983 and is part of the Hospital Corporation of America (HCA).

References

External links

Hospital buildings completed in 1983
Hospitals in New Hampshire
Buildings and structures in Rockingham County, New Hampshire
Derry, New Hampshire
Hospitals established in 1983
1983 establishments in New Hampshire